WQLH (98.5 FM, "Star 98") is a hot adult contemporary formatted radio station licensed to Green Bay, Wisconsin and serving Green Bay, Appleton, Oshkosh, and Northeast Wisconsin.  The station is owned and operated by Cumulus Media. WQLH's studios are located on Victoria Street in Green Bay, while its transmitter is located near Suamico.

History
The station launched in 1967 as WDUZ-FM on 98.3 with 3,000 watts and a minimal antenna height of 77' (and would later move to 98.5) (a sister station to WDUZ) and aired a beautiful music format until January 1990.  At that time, the station shifted to a soft adult contemporary format as "Light 98.5 WQLH" (meaning "Quality Light Hits").  The format would evolve into a more modern (and more upbeat) hot adult contemporary playlist by the mid-1990s (with the station being rebranded as "98.5 Mix FM"), eventually adopting the "Star 98" branding in December 1999, when the station was purchased by Cumulus Media.

Cumulus swapped WQLH and four other Green Bay stations to Clear Channel in 2009 in exchange for two Cincinnati radio stations; however, Cumulus continued to operate the stations. In August 2013, Clear Channel reached a deal to sell the five stations back to Cumulus.

References

External links

QLH
Hot adult contemporary radio stations in the United States
Cumulus Media radio stations